National Poetry Month, a celebration of poetry which takes place each April, was introduced in 1996 and is organized by the Academy of American Poets as a way to increase awareness and appreciation of poetry in the United States. The Academy of American Poets' website Poets.org serves as a hub for information about local poetry events during the month. The organization also provides free educational resources to teachers for classroom celebrations and activities, and commissions an annual festival poster. Since 1998, National Poetry Month has also been celebrated each April in Canada.

History

National Poetry Month was inspired by the success of Black History Month, held each February, and Women's History Month, held in March. In 1995, the Academy of American Poets convened a group of publishers, booksellers, librarians, literary organizations, poets, and teachers to discuss the need and usefulness of a similar monthlong holiday to celebrate poetry. The first National Poetry Month was held in 1996.

In 1998, the Academy of American Poets joined the American Poetry & Literacy Project to distribute 100,000 free books of poetry from New York to California during National Poetry Month. On April 22, President Clinton and the First Lady hosted a gala at the White House that featured Poets Laureate Robert Pinsky, Robert Hass, and Rita Dove.

For National Poetry Month in 2001, the Academy of American Poets invited people to "vote" for poets they most wanted to have a postage stamp. More than 10,000 people cast ballots, with Langston Hughes receiving the most votes. The vote tally was sent to the United States Postal Service, which issued a Langston Hughes stamp in January 2002.

On April 5, 2005 the Empire State Building was illuminated with blue lights to mark the 10th anniversary of National Poetry Month.

In 2006, the Academy of American Poets launched Poem-a-Day, publishing one new poem on its website Poets.org each day during the month-long celebration. Poem-a-Day is now a daily, year-long series, which has been syndicated by King Features.

In 2012, the Academy of American Poets launched the Dear Poet project, which invites students to read and write poems during National Poetry Month, some of which are published on Poets.org. The project is accompanied by a lesson plan offered to K-12 teachers for free.

Each year, a special poster is commissioned by the Academy of American Poets for National Poetry Month, with almost 150,000 copies distributed to schools, libraries, and community centers for free. In the past, posters have been designed by noted graphic designers such as Chip Kidd and Milton Glaser. The 2015 National Poetry Month poster was designed by New Yorker illustrator Roz Chast.

Numerous books and poetry compilations have been published acknowledging National Poetry Month, such as The Knopf National Poetry Month Collection by Random House and Celebrating National Poetry Month by children's book author and poet Bruce Larkin.

In 2021, the Andrew W. Mellon Foundation and the Academy of American Poets commemorated the 25th anniversary of National Poetry Month.

Purpose
Like Black History Month, the celebration of poetry each April has grown and established itself organically, in both official and unofficial ways. Each year, publishers, booksellers, educators and literary organizations use April to promote poetry: publishers often release and publicize their poetry titles in April, teachers and librarians focus on poetry units during the month; and bookstores and reading series frequently hold special readings.
National Poetry Writing Month encourages writing a poem a day in celebration.

Proclamations
In a proclamation issued on April 1, 1996, President Bill Clinton declared: "National Poetry Month offers us a welcome opportunity to celebrate not only the unsurpassed body of literature produced by our poets in the past, but also the vitality and diversity of voices reflected in the works of today's American poetry….Their creativity and wealth of language enrich our culture and inspire a new generation of Americans to learn the power of reading and writing at its best." In addition, similar official National Poetry Month proclamation have been issued by mayors from towns and cities across the country, including New York City, Los Angeles, Chicago, Tucson, and Washington, D.C.

Poetry & the Creative Mind

In 2002, the Academy organized the first Poetry & the Creative Mind gala to raise funds in support of National Poetry Month, and it has become an annual event. Each year the Academy invites some of America’s leading artists, scholars, and public figures to read their favorite poems. Hosted each year by the three-time Academy Award-winning actress Meryl Streep, the event has featured readings by Liam Neeson, Tony Kushner, Maya Lin, Sam Waterston, Suzan-Lori Parks, Minnie Driver, Dan Rather, Agnes Gund, Frank Rich, Diane von Fürstenberg, Wynton Marsalis, Alan Alda, Wendy Whelan, Mike Wallace, Dianne Wiest, Oliver Sacks, Gloria Vanderbilt, William Wegman, and Christopher Durang, among others.

Debate
National Poetry Month has also sparked some debate among writers, most notably in 1999 from poet and academic Charles Bernstein. Critics suggest that National Poetry Month trivializes the art form and floods the market with books in a matter of just a few weeks, overwhelming readers.

International recurring celebrations

National Poetry Day, founded in 1995 by William Sieghart, is celebrated on the first or second Thursday of October in the United Kingdom; this has become an established fixture in the cultural calendar. Events take place in schools, pubs, arts centres, bookshops, libraries, buses, trains and Women’s Institutes, and the day is the focus for media attention for poetry.  National Poetry Day is co-ordinated by the Forward Arts Foundation (a registered charity), which also runs the Forward Prizes for Poetry. A theme is chosen in consultation with the National Poetry Day partners: in 2015,  National Poetry Day falls on October 8 and the theme is Light.

Since 1999, National Poetry Month has been celebrated each April in Canada, where it is sponsored by the League of Canadian Poets and organized around a different annual theme.

In 1999, UNESCO (the United Nations Educational, Scientific and Cultural Organization) declared March 21 to be World Poetry Day. The purpose of the day is to promote the reading, writing, publishing and teaching of poetry throughout the world and, as the UNESCO session declaring the day says, to "give fresh recognition and impetus to national, regional and international poetry movements."

In the United Kingdom the festival “October is National Poetry Month” was founded in 2000 by Celtic bard Jim MacCool and was adopted by the Birmingham-based Performance Poetry Society that same year. From makeshift beginnings, National Poetry Month has been exploited by primary and secondary schools, colleges of further education, public library services, the prison estate, and to a lesser extent, more localised festivals. Professional poets appear in all corners of the United Kingdom under the aegis of the Performance Poetry Society, which co-ordinates a proportion of their efforts and ensures that they are paid a normal rate for their appearances.

On October 8, 2009, the BBC announced on National Poetry Day the results of its poll to find the nation's favourite poet. The winner was T. S. Eliot, followed by John Donne, Benjamin Zephaniah, Wilfred Owen and Philip Larkin (in that order).

Notes

External links
Rainy Day Poems A collection of classic poems and modern poetry books
National Poetry Month at the Academy of American Poets website 
Against National Poetry Month As Such, essay by Charles Bernstein
Library of Congress - National Poetry Month
Article about Canada's National Poetry Month, April 2, 2008.
National Poetry Month Events in Chicago
Rhode Island College LibGuide - National Poetry Month
Haiku inspired by Ito Jakuchu's Colorful Realm of Living Beings, April 2012
Twenty, Ten, Twenty-Five: 20 poets, 10 poems, 25 years of National Poetry Month, April 2021

American poetry
April observances
1996 introductions
Poetry organizations
Commemorative months